Akimoto (written: 秋元 or 秋本) is a Japanese surname. Notable people with the surname include:

, Japanese hurdler
, Japanese daimyō
, Japanese judoka
Jin Akimoto (born 1971), Japanese mixed martial artist
, Japanese singer
, Japanese politician
, Japanese baseball player
, Japanese fashion model
, Japanese photographer
, Japanese idol, singer, actress and television personality
Masahiro Akimoto (disambiguation), multiple people
, Japanese playwright
, Japanese politician
, Japanese footballer
, Japanese manga artist
, Japanese actress and singer
, Japanese manga artist
, Japanese actor and model
, Japanese actress, singer and idol
, Japanese actress
, Japanese politician
, Japanese television writer, lyricist and academic
, Japanese actor and voice actor
, Japanese footballer

Fictional characters
 Komachi Akimoto, a character in the anime series Yes! Pretty Cure 5
 Reiko Akimoto, a character in the manga series Kochikame

Japanese-language surnames